Charles Boydell Dutton (16 August 1834 – 5 February 1904), was pastoralist and politician in colonial Queensland.

Early life

Dutton was born in Singleton, New South Wales, the son of Henry Pelerin Dutton (c. 1803 – 30 January 1870), a Hunter River squatter, and his wife Sophia Hume Dutton, née Bell (c. 1804 – 18 August 1889).

Politics

Dutton was a member of the Queensland Legislative Assembly for Leichhardt from 23 August 1883 to 5 May 1888 and Secretary for Lands from 13 November 1883 to 30 August 1887; Secretary for Works and Mines from the latter date till 12 December 1887; and from that date till 13 June 1888 Secretary for Railways in the First Griffith Ministry. At the general election in 1888, Dutton was an unsuccessful candidate for the Leichhardt district. Dutton, who embraced Henry George's land nationalisation theories, and endeavoured as Secretary for Lands to give some approximate effect to them in legislation, then became a squatter in New South Wales.

Later life

Dutton died on 5 February 1904 in Tenterfield, New South Wales.

Legacy

The suburb of Dutton Park in Brisbane is named after him. Australian federal politician, Peter Dutton, is Charles Dutton's great great grandson.

References

1834 births
1904 deaths
Members of the Queensland Legislative Assembly
People from the Hunter Region
19th-century Australian politicians
Georgist politicians